Gazipur Metropolitan Police (GMP) is the chief law enforcement agency in Gazipur, Bangladesh. It was established in 2018 under the Gazipur Metropolitan Police Ordinance approved by the Government of Bangladesh. Molla Nazrul Islam is the Commissioner of Gazipur Metropolitan Police. Abdullah Al Mamun is the deputy commissioner.

History 
The Government of Bangladesh announced plans to establish Gazipur Metropolitan Police and Rangpur Metropolitan Police in December 2015 at a cabinet meeting chaired by Prime Minister Sheikh Hasina.

In November 2017, the Cabinet of Bangladesh approved Gazipur and Rangpur Metropolitan Police drafts.

A woman, Yasmin Begum, died in the custody of the Detective Branch of Gazipur Metropolitan Police few hours after she had been detained. Her family had demanded that her death in custody be investigated by a judicial commission. Councilor of Gazipur City, Ruhun Nesa Runa, was arrested in March 2020 after she assaulted two traffic police constables who stopped her car which was driving on the wrong side of the road.

A woman miscarried after a constable of Gazipur Metropolitan Police assaulted her in March 2022. The constable was later withdrawn from the Kashimpur Police Station. On 2 April 2022, seven members of Gazipur Metropolitan Police were injured in clashes with Hefazat-e-Islam Bangladesh. In April 2022, two police constables were transferred for assaulting the chauffeur of the Deputy Commissioner of Gazipur District.

List of police stations under GMP
 Gazipur Sadar
 Tongi East
 Tongi West
 Gacha
 Bason
 Konabari
 Kashimpur
 Pubail

References

Bangladesh Police
Government of Gazipur
Municipal law enforcement agencies of Bangladesh